Hispanic was an American English-language magazine of pop culture, fashion, and politics published by Televisa Publishing. In 2008, it was the largest English language lifestyle magazine in the U.S. Hispanic market. The magazine was closed in 2010.

History
Founded in 1988, Hispanic had an ABC-audited circulation of 315,000, reaching upwardly mobile Hispanic professionals, corporate executives, entrepreneurs, opinion leaders, members of Hispanic organizations, and students. 
Hispanic's editorial focus was on lifestyle, culture, entertainment, business, career and politics, with upbeat, informative and timely stories.

Contents
The editorial breakdown of the magazine as of 2007 was 35% lifestyle, 25% entertainment, 15% culture, 15% general interest, 5% business, 3% calendar and 2% career. 
The pages of Hispanic consistently featured the most prominent Hispanic artists in the U.S. and beyond: such as Benicio del Toro, Andy García, Antonio Banderas, Perez Hilton, Ricky Martin, Penélope Cruz, Paz Vega, Diego Luna and Juanes.

See also

People en Español

References

1988 establishments in Florida
2010 disestablishments in Florida
Cultural magazines published in the United States
Fashion magazines published in the United States
Monthly magazines published in the United States
Defunct magazines published in the United States
Hispanic and Latino American mass media
Magazines established in 1988
Magazines disestablished in 2010
Magazines published in Florida